The Night Land is a horror/fantasy novel by English writer William Hope Hodgson, first published in 1912. As a work of fantasy it belongs to the Dying Earth subgenre. Hodgson also published a much shorter version of the novel, entitled The Dream of X (1912).

Publication history
The Night Land was revived in paperback by Ballantine Books, which republished the work in two parts as the 49th and 50th volumes of its Ballantine Adult Fantasy series in July 1972. H. P. Lovecraft's essay "Supernatural Horror in Literature" describes the novel as "one of the most potent pieces of macabre imagination ever written". Clark Ashton Smith wrote of it:

When the book was written, the nature of the energy source that powers stars was not known: Lord Kelvin had published calculations based on the hypothesis that the energy came from the gravitational collapse of the gas cloud that had formed the sun and found that this mechanism gave the Sun a lifetime of only a few tens of million of years. Starting from this premise, Hodgson wrote a novel describing a time, millions of years in the future, when the Sun has gone dark.

Plot summary

The beginning of the book establishes the framework in which a 17th-century gentleman, mourning the death of his beloved, Lady Mirdath, is given a vision of a far-distant future where their souls will be re-united, and sees the world of that time through the eyes of a future incarnation. The language and style used are intended to resemble those of the 17th century, though the prose has features characteristic of no particular period, such as an almost complete lack of dialogue or proper names. Ian Bell has suggested that John Milton's epic poem Paradise Lost (1667) was probably a partial inspiration for Hodgson's novel, especially in view of the hellish visions of sombre intensity that mark both works, and the use of massive structures (the Temple of Pandemonium in Milton and the Last Redoubt in The Night Land).

The 17th-century framing becomes inconsequential as the story focuses on the future. The Sun has gone out and the Earth is lit only by the glow of residual vulcanism. The last few millions of the human race are gathered together in the Last Redoubt, a gigantic metal pyramid, nearly eight miles high, which is under siege from unknown forces and Powers outside in the dark. These are held back by a shield known as the "air clog", powered from a subterranean energy source called the "Earth Current". For thousands of years vast living shapes known as the Watchers have waited in the darkness near the pyramid. It is thought that they are waiting for the inevitable time when the Circle's power finally weakens and dies. Other living things have been seen in the darkness, some of unknown origins, and others that may once have been human. Hodgson uses the term "Abhuman" to name several different species of intelligent beings evolved from humans who interbred with alien species or adapted to changed environmental conditions, and are seen as decayed or maligned by those living inside the Last Redoubt.

To leave the protection of the Circle means almost certain death, or, worse, destruction of the soul. The narrator establishes mind contact with an inhabitant of a forgotten Lesser Redoubt. First, one expedition sets off to succour the inhabitants of the Lesser Redoubt, whose own Earth Current has been exhausted, only to meet with disaster. After that the narrator sets off alone into the darkness to find the girl he has made contact with, knowing now that she is the reincarnation of his past love.

At the conclusion of the adventure the narrative does not return to the framework story, but ends with the homecoming of the couple and the narrator's inauguration into the ranks of their most honoured heroes.

The Dream of X
The abridged version of the novel was first published in the United States in 1912 in chapbook form as Poems and a Dream of X (New York: R. H. Paget, 1912), in an extremely limited print run. In this edition, the 200,000-word novel was condensed to a 20,000-word novelette, originally for the purpose of establishing copyright; also included was a novelette entitled Mutiny, an abridged version of the story "'Prentices' Mutiny", and thirteen of Hodgson's poems, which were later included in his other posthumously published books of poetry. The abridgement by itself was republished in a limited edition in 1977, with an introduction by Sam Moskowitz and color illustrations by Stephen Fabian, under the title The Dream of X (West Kingston, R.I.: Donald M. Grant, 1977).

Pastiche, homages and sequels

Greg Bear's short story "The Way of All Ghosts", dedicated to William Hope Hodgson, is set in the Way, the artificial space-time structure featured in several of Bear's novels, beginning with Eon (1985). A recurring character from these novels, Ser Olmy, is given a mission to investigate an experiment which had gone horribly wrong. The experimenters had attempted to open a gate into a universe of pure order, and the survivors find themselves trapped in a region of the Way that has transformed to a chaotic state resembling the Night Land.

Another work of Greg Bear's, City at the End of Time (2008), shares a number of plot elements with The Night Land and contains a specific reference to the Last Redoubt, giving William Hope Hodgson himself a cameo role in the story line.

The short-fiction collections William Hope Hodgson's Night Lands: Eternal Love (2003) and William Hope Hodgson's Night Lands: Nightmares of the Fall (2007) contain short stories set in a universe combining The Night Land with The House on the Borderland. A third collection (to be titled The Days of Darkening) was still in progress . The first collection was nominated for a British Fantasy Award for Best Anthology by the British Fantasy Society in 2004.

James Stoddard's novel, The Night Land, A Story Retold (2011) is a retelling of The Night Land, intended for modern readers who may be unwilling to read the archaic language of the original. While retaining the story of The Night Land, it departs from the original by naming the main character, adding brief scenes, and using dialogue (the original version had none). An early draft of the second chapter of Stoddard's rewrite appears in William Hope Hodgson's Night Lands: Eternal Love.

Awake in the Night Land (2014) is a new collection of stories set in the world of Night Land written by John C. Wright, published by Castalia House.

References

Bibliography

 (A recent hardcover reprint.)

External links

 
 

 

1912 British novels
British fantasy novels
British science fiction novels
1912 fantasy novels
1912 science fiction novels
Novels by William Hope Hodgson
Dying Earth (genre)
Weird fiction novels